Mohammed Khalfan Ali Salmein Al Mesmari (born 29 December 1992) is an Emirati footballer. He currently plays for Al Urooba on loan from Dibba Al Fujairah.

International
He made his debut for the United Arab Emirates national football team on 26 March 2019 in a friendly against Syria.

References

External links
 

Emirati footballers
United Arab Emirates international footballers
1992 births
Living people
Fujairah FC players
Al-Wasl F.C. players
Dibba FC players
Sharjah FC players
Khor Fakkan Sports Club players
Al Urooba Club players
UAE First Division League players
UAE Pro League players
Association football wingers
Footballers at the 2018 Asian Games
Asian Games bronze medalists for the United Arab Emirates
Asian Games medalists in football
Medalists at the 2018 Asian Games
2019 AFC Asian Cup players